Commatica cryptina is a moth in the family Gelechiidae. It was described by Walsingham in 1911. It is found in Mexico (Tabasco).

The wingspan is 8–9 mm. The forewings are dark tawny brownish fuscous, slightly bestrewn with steely grey scales and with a slender pale steel-grey streak running obliquely outward from the commencement of the costal cilia to a little below the apex, where it is angulated and continued indistinctly to the tornus. The hindwings are dark bronzy brownish.

References

Commatica
Moths described in 1911